Vagrantini is a tribe of butterflies in the subfamily Heliconiinae found from east Africa over the Indian subcontinent to eastern Asia and Australia.

Genera
Listed in alphabetical order:
 Algia Herrich-Schäffer, 1864
 Algiachroa Parsons, 1989
 Cirrochroa Doubleday, 1847 – yeomen 
 Cupha Billberg, 1820
 Lachnoptera Doubleday, 1847
 Phalanta Horsfield, 1829 – leopards
 Smerina Hewitson, 1874
 Terinos Boisduval, 1836
 Vagrans Hemming, 1934
 Vindula Hemming, 1934

References

 

Butterfly tribes